Norman S. Berson (November 19, 1926 – December 7, 2019) was a Democratic member of the Pennsylvania House of Representatives from 1967 to 1982.

Formative years
Born in New York City, New York on November 19, 1926, Berson graduated from the George School in 1946, before earning his Bachelor of Arts degree from Temple University in 1950 and his Bachelor of Law (L.L.B) from Temple's Law School in 1953. A member of the United States Army during World War II, he served from 1945 to 1946.

Professionally, he was then employed as an attorney.

Political career
A Democrat, Berson was elected to the Pennsylvania House of Representatives in 1966, serving a total of eight consecutive terms. Appointed to the Pennsylvania Commission on Sentencing in 1979, he served until 1982. He was not a candidate for reelection to the House in 1982.

In 1977, Berson introduced a bill to reduce the penalty for marijuana possession.

Later professional life
Serving as "of counsel" with Fineman Krekstein & Harris PC from 1981 to the present (as of summer 2019), he has also been a Director for RCM Technologies, Inc. (1987–present).

Death
Berson died of Parkinson's disease on December 7, 2019, in Philadelphia, Pennsylvania at age 93.

References

1926 births
2019 deaths
Politicians from New York City
Military personnel from New York City
Lawyers from New York City
Lawyers from Philadelphia
Temple University alumni
Democratic Party members of the Pennsylvania House of Representatives
20th-century American lawyers